Ketosteroid monooxygenase (steroid-ketone monooxygenase, progesterone, NADPH2:oxygen oxidoreductase (20-hydroxylating, ester-producing), 17alpha-hydroxyprogesterone, NADPH2:oxygen oxidoreductase (20-hydroxylating, side-chain cleaving), androstenedione, NADPH2:oxygen oxidoreductase (17-hydroxylating, lactonizing)) is an enzyme with systematic name ketosteroid,NADPH:oxygen oxidoreductase (20-hydroxylating, ester-producing/20-hydroxylating, side-chain cleaving/17-hydroxylating, lactonizing). This enzyme catalyses the following chemical reaction

 ketosteroid + NADPH + H+ + O2  steroid ester/lactone + NADP+ + H2O (general reaction)
(1) progesterone + NADPH + H+ + O2  testosterone acetate + NADP+ + H2O
(2) androstenedione + NADPH + H+ + O2  testololactone + NADP+ + H2O
(3) 17alpha-hydroxyprogesterone + NADPH + H+ + O2  androstenedione + acetate + NADP+ + H2O

Ketosteroid monooxygenase is a single FAD-containing enzyme that catalyses three types of monooxygenase reaction.

References

External links 
 

EC 1.14.13